Air Siam was an airline based in Thailand which operated from 1965 until 1976.

History
The airline was established as Varan Air-Siam on 15 September 1965 by Prince Varanand, who was the major shareholder at the time. Operations started in 1970 using Douglas DC-4 equipment, initially flying the Bangkok−Hong Kong route as a freighter service. Following an agreement with Overseas National Airways for the wet-lease of a Douglas DC-8-63 and operational assistance from Trans World Airlines, scheduled passenger services started in  serving Bangkok, Honolulu, Tokyo and Los Angeles.

In , the carrier placed an order for two Airbus A300s, one A300B2 and one A300B4, taking an option for one more of the longer-range variant. Also in 1974, the company placed an order for a Douglas DC-10-30, to be used on the Bangkok–Los Angeles route. Rights for the routes the airline intended to deploy the A300s on were never granted, and the A300B2 was returned to the lessor just a year after it was incorporated into the fleet.

Before Air Siam started flying long-haul services, Thailand's flag carrier Thai International was the country's single long-haul operator. Already in 1974, the airline had accused both Thai International and the Thai Civil Aeronautics Board for obstructing their expansion plans. Despite various governments had considered the possibility of a merger, this never materialised. A new government taking office in 1976 had a different vision and decided that Thailand should have just one long-haul carrier.

Destinations

Throughout its history, the airline served the following destinations:
 Hong Kong
 Hong KongKai Tak Airport
 Japan
 TokyoHaneda Airport
 Thailand
 BangkokDon Mueang International Airport (Hub)
 United States
 HonoluluDaniel K. Inouye International Airport

Fleet
Following is a list of aircraft operated by Air Siam all through its history:

 Airbus A300B2
 Airbus A300B4
 BAC One-Eleven 400
 Boeing 707-120
 Boeing 747-100
 Boeing 747-200B
 Douglas C-54A
 Douglas C-54B
 Douglas DC-4
 Douglas DC-8-60
 McDonnell Douglas DC-10-30

See also

 List of airlines of Thailand

References

External links

 Air Siam fleet information

Defunct airlines of Thailand
Airlines established in 1965
Airlines disestablished in 1976
1976 disestablishments in Thailand
Thai companies established in 1965